86 Wing or 86th Wing may refer to:

 No. 86 Wing RAAF, a formation of the Royal Australian Air Force 
 86th Airlift Wing, a formation of the United States Air Force 
 86th Fighter Wing (World War II), a formation of the United States Army Air Corps

See also
 86th Division (disambiguation)
 86th Brigade (disambiguation)
 86th Regiment (disambiguation)